Buchanan is an unincorporated community in Cedar County, Iowa, United States.

History
It was named for Alexander Buchanan, a farmer who owned land near the original town site. Alexander Buchanan was born in Cedar County in 1841. Buchanan's population was 27 in 1902, and 61 in 1925.

References

Unincorporated communities in Cedar County, Iowa
Unincorporated communities in Iowa